The 2014 Challenger Team Città di Padova was a professional tennis tournament played on clay courts. It was the first edition of the tournament which was part of the 2014 ATP Challenger Tour. It took place in Padova, Italy between 23 and 29 June 2013.

Singles main-draw entrants

Seeds

 1 Rankings are as of June 16, 2014.

Other entrants
The following players received wildcards into the singles main draw:
  Alessandro Giannessi
  Salvatore Caruso
  Federico Gaio
  Marco Bortolotti

The following players received entry from the qualifying draw:
  Martín Cuevas
  Hugo Dellien
  Laurent Lokoli
  Nikola Čačić

Doubles main-draw entrants

Seeds

1 Rankings as of June 16, 2014.

Other entrants
The following pairs received wildcards into the doubles main draw:
  Tommaso Lago /  Francesco Picco
  Marco Bergagnin /  Lorenzo Schmid
  Andrea Fava /  Riccardo Marcon

Champions

Singles

  Máximo González def.  Albert Ramos, 6–3, 6–4

Doubles

 Roberto Maytín /  Andrés Molteni def.  Guillermo Durán /  Máximo González, 6–2, 3–6, [10–8]

References

External links
[ Official Website]

Challenger Team Citta di Padova